Soreption is a technical death metal band from Sundsvall, Västernorrlands län, Sweden. Formed in 2005, they are best known for their fast melodies and sharp,
groovy riffs. In 2013, Soreption was chosen among a list of acts selected to perform at The Summer Slaughter Tour. They also played a few shows on the 2018 edition of Summer Slaughter until August 7, when they were forced to cancel all future dates on the tour due to visa issues. Soreption was also forced to drop Suffocation's Death Chopping North America for the same reasons. They have released one EP and four full-length albums.

In 2014, after the release of their album Engineering The Void, bass player Rickard Persson left the band and was replaced by Mikael Almgren of technical metal band Terminal Function. In December 2016, guitarist Anton Svedin left the band and was replaced by current bassist Mikael Almgren. Kim Lantto of Facial Abuse and Festering Remains joined as the new bass player. In 2019, the song "A Mimic's Ignorance" appeared in the Netflix show On My Block .

In April 2022, the band announced their new album, Jord, would be released on June 10.

Discography 
Studio albums
Deterioration of Minds (2010)
Engineering the Void (2014)
Monument of the End (2018)
Jord (2022)

EPs
Illuminate the Excessive (2007)

Band members
Current
 Fredrik Söderberg - vocals (2005–present)
 Tony Westermark - drums (2005–present)
 Rickard Persson - bass (2005-2014, 2018-present)

Current live/touring members
 Ian Waye - guitars (2022-present)

Former
 Mikael Almgren - guitars (2016–2021), bass (2014-2016)
 Kim Lantto - bass (2016–2018)
 Anton Svedin - guitars (2005-2016)

Former live/touring members
Justin McKinney – guitars (2018)

Timeline

References

Swedish heavy metal musical groups
Swedish technical death metal musical groups
Deathcore musical groups